Metrópoli Patriotismo is a shopping center at Av. Patriotismo 229, in the San Pedro de los Pinos neighborhood in Mexico City. It is anchored by a Cinemex multi-cinema, Sanborns, and a ONE hotel. The design was by Grupo Arquitech.

The center opened in 2006 and represented an investment of 615 million pesos.
The new section of the complex was built northbound of the original, in the limits with the neighboring Colonia Escandón.

External links
Official website

References

Shopping malls in Greater Mexico City
Shopping malls established in 2006